Sandy Islands is a group of four islands located in the northern basin on Lake Winnipeg in the Canadian province of Manitoba. The Sandy Islands together with Little George Island, George Island and the Spider Islands form a chain of islands, which are a continuation of The Pas Moraine.

Other islands in the group are Little Sandy Island to northwest of the main island, and Cannibal Island to southeast. The smallest island is located in the narrow strait between Little Sandy and Big Sandy islands.

The islands are uninhabited with no man-made structures present.

References

Islands of Lake Winnipeg
Uninhabited islands of Canada